Youanmi Downs or Youanmi Downs Station is a pastoral lease that once operated as a cattle station.
The eastern boundary of the station adjoins Yuinmery and the southern boundary adjoins Lake Barlee Station.

Prospector Tom Payne discovered gold in the area in 1896 and it was named Youanmi shortly afterwards. By 1912 Sandstone had a population of 8,000 and Youanmi had a population of 300. The first pastoral lease were being established at this time.

The property was established prior to 1917, the same year in which the property was supporting a herd of several hundred cattle. Otherwise the surrounding area was principally a gold mining centre with the Youanmi Gold Mine being the largest of the mines operating in the vicinity.
By 1927 the property was running sheep and producing wool.

Youanmi and neighbouring Youangarra Station were placed up for sale together in 1953 for £32,000. Two homesteads and shearing sheds were included along with a flock of 9,000 sheep.

See also
List of ranches and stations

References

Pastoral leases in Western Australia
Stations (Australian agriculture)
Mid West (Western Australia)